Jain texts assign a wide range of meaning to the Sanskrit dharma or Prakrit dhamma. It is often translated as “religion” and as such, Jainism is called Jain Dharma by its adherents. 

In Jainism, the word "Dharma" is used to refer the following: religion; dharmastikaay (the principle of motion) as a dravya (substance or a reality); the true nature of a thing; and ten virtues like forgiveness, etc., also called ten forms of dharma.

Religion 
Usage of the word "dharma" in reference to the religion include:

Ahimsa as Dharma

According to Jain texts, Ahimsa is the greatest dharma (अहिंसा परमॊ धर्मः [ahiṃsā paramo dharmaḥ]: "non-violence is the highest religion") and there is no religion equal to the religion of non-violence.

Dharma bhāvanā 
Jain texts prescribe meditation on twelve forms of reflection (bhāvanā) for those who wish to stop the influx of karmas that extend transmigration. One such reflection is Dharma bhāvanā:

Conduct 
In Jainism, the dharma (conduct or path) of the householder (Śrāvaka) is distinguished from the conduct of an ascetic. Sravaka-dharma is the religious path for the virtuous householders, where charity and worship are the primary duties. The dharma of a householders consists of observance of twelve vows i.e. five minor vows and seven disciplinary vows.
Sramana-dharma is the religious path of the virtuous ascetics, where meditation and study of scriptures is their primary duty. The religion of monks consists of five Mahavratas or great vows. They are endowed with right faith, right knowledge and right conduct and engaged in complete self-restraint and penances.

As svabhaav (nature) of a substance
According to Jainism, the universe and its constituents are uncreated and everlasting. These constituents behave according to the natural laws and their nature (svabhaav) without interference from external entities. Dharma or true religion according to Jainism is vatthu sahāvo dhammo translated as "the intrinsic nature of a substance is its true dharma."

Dharmastikaay dravya (the substance)
Dharmastikaay is one of the  six substances constituting the universe. These substances are – Dharmastikaay  (medium of motion),  Adharmastikaay (medium of rest), Akasa (space), kala (time), Pudgala (matter) and Jiva (soul). Since Dharmastikaay as a substance extends and pervades entire universe, it is known as Dharm-astikaya. It helps the matter and souls in movement. It itself is not motion, but is a medium of motion. Adharmastikaay is opposite of Dharmastikaay i.e. it assists the substances like soul and matter to rest.

Samyaktva - rationality of perception, knowledge and conduct

According to Jainism, samyak darsana (rational perception), samyak jnana (rational knowledge) and samyak caritra (rational conduct) collectively also known as ratnatraya or the "three jewels of Jainism" constitute the path to liberation.

Samyak darsana or rational perception is the rational faith in the true nature of every substances of the universe. Samyak Jnana or rational knowledge is the right knowledge of true and relevant knowledge of the reality, the tattvas. It incorporates the two principles of  anekantvada or non-absolutism and syadvada or relativity of truth. Right knowledge must be free from three main defects: doubt, delusion, and indefiniteness. Samyak caritra or rational conduct is the natural conduct of a (soul) living being. It consists in following austerities, engaging in right activities and observance of vows, carefulness and controls.

Ten virtues as dharma
According to the Jain text, Tattvarthsutra, the following are the ten virtues (das-dharma):
Supreme forgiveness
Supreme humility
Supreme straightforwardness
Supreme truthfulness
Supreme purity
Supreme self-restraint
Supreme penance
Supreme renunciation
Supreme non-possessiveness
Supreme celibacy

References

Sources 

Jain philosophical concepts